Shensa Saveh Futsal Club was an Iranian futsal club based in Saveh.

Honours 
National
 Iranian Futsal Super League
 Champions (2): 2003–04, 2005–06

Continental:
Asia Futsal Cup
Champions (1): 2006
 Golden Cup
Champions (1): 2007

Season-by-season 
The table below chronicles the achievements of the Club in various competitions.

Notes:
* unofficial titles
1 worst title in history of club

 Key

P   = Played
W   = Games won
D   = Games drawn
L   = Games lost

GF  = Goals for
GA  = Goals against
Pts = Points
Pos = Final position

Players

World Cup Players 

 World Cup 2000
  Moslem Tolouei

 World Cup 2004
  Mohammad Keshavarz

Former players

References

External links

Fan sites 
Shensa Blog

Futsal clubs established in 1996
Futsal clubs in Iran
Sport in Markazi Province
Sport in Saveh
2008 disestablishments in Iran
Defunct futsal clubs in Iran